Pietro Candido may refer to:

Pietro Candido Decembrio (1399–1477), Italian humanist
Peter Candid (d. 1628), Flemish painter